Àngel Ros i Domingo (born 1952, Lleida) is a Spanish politician and statesman. He was Mayor of Lleida from 2004 to 2018. He is the president of Socialists' Party of Catalonia since 25 July 2014 until 2019, and Ambassador of Spain to Andorra since 3 August 2018.

References

External links

 

1952 births
Living people
People from Lleida
Socialists' Party of Catalonia politicians
Mayors of places in Catalonia
University of Barcelona alumni
Polytechnic University of Madrid alumni
Academic staff of ESADE
Members of the 10th Parliament of Catalonia
Spanish diplomats
Municipal councillors in the province of Lleida